Maratha Invasion of Goa (1683) refers to the invasion of the Portuguese controlled portion of Goa and Konkan. The battles were fought between the Maratha kingdom and the Portuguese in Goa and Bombay-Bassein, on various fronts in between 1682-1683. 

The Portuguese maintained cordial relations with the Marathas during the reign of Shivaji, as they kept the Deccan Sultanates in check. 
As the Portuguese were an ocean based empire, they were not interested in any inland conquests aside from a handful of lucrative coastal ports.
However, in 1682, 2 years after the death of Shivaji, Marathas under Sambaji started building fortifications along their border with Portuguese territories. This concerned the Portuguese and made them reluctantly align with their adversaries - Mughal empire, to avert a looming invasion. 
This concern would materialize as a series of surprise Maratha raids in and around the regions of present-day Goa, Bombay and other parts of the Konkan. 

The Ponda Fort near the capital city of Velha Goa was a strategic Maratha position that was starting to mobilize. Hence the Portuguese viceroy Francisco de Távora led an attack on it in late 1683, attempting to prevent a raid. Sambhaji ordered reinforcements to press on the advantage of the Portuguese retreat at Ponda and elsewhere. He stormed Goa, temporarily occupied many forts and razing villages. The Maratha forces were preemptively mobilised, and the Portuguese situation eventually became dire. Sambhaji ransacked the north Konkan region for over a month, his forces also pillaged Salcette and Bardes areas in south Konkan. Sambhaji came  but his forces retreated from all Portuguese lands in Goa and the Konkan on 2 January 1684, to avoid the large Moghul armed force led by Bahadur Shah I (Muazzam).

Background 
The Portuguese Empire was a powerful naval empire in the 17th century. They had established several enclaves on the west coast of India. The Portuguese territories of Damaon, Chaul, Bacaim, Goa and several others, bordered the Maratha Empire. The Marathas during the lifetime of Shivaji had maintained relatively good relations with the Portuguese East Indies. His successor, Sambhaji wanted to check up the Portuguese by constructing forts over at strategic locations, one being Anjediva off the coast of modern-day North Canara, and another on Parsik Hill in modern-day New Bombay. The Portuguese were alarmed at the mobilisation of Maratha forces and fortification at the borders, and attempted to stop the construction of the forts in 1683. In August 1683, the Portuguese allowed the Mughal army to pass through their northern territories against the Marathas. When Sambhaji received information about Mughal-Portuguese cooperation. He adopted an aggressive strategy by attacking the villages of Chaul, Bacaim and Daman. The Marathas then plundered Portuguese controlled villages in Dahanu, Asheri and Bacaim. In response the Portuguese arrested the Maratha envoy Yesaji Gambhir. Sambhaji's Peshwa Nilopant Pingle waged aggressive war against the Portuguese. He devastated, plundered& occupied 40 miles of Portuguese territory including the villages of Chembur, Talode, Kolve, Mahim, Dantore, Sargaon. The Portuguese retaliated by arresting Maratha merchant ships. They also attacked the newly built fort on Parsik Hill. All these events took place in April–May 1683. The Marathas also besieged Revdanda fort and plundered its village in July 1683. The Portuguese Viceroy Francisco de Távora, wanted the capture of Sambhaji. Desai Brahmins of Sawantwadi sided with the Portuguese in this conflict, as they lost most of their political privileges under the Maratha rule.

Battle of Ponda Fort 
The Portuguese viceroy marched towards the Fortress of Ponda, with 3,700 soldiers. Viceroy camped at the border village of Agaçaim on 27 October 1683. They crossed the river and reached the villages west of Ponda on 7 November. Veteran Maratha general Yesaji Kank and his son Krishnaji were stationed at Ponda with a force of 600 Mavalas. The Marathas resisted the initial Portuguese infantry charges. In one of these skirmishes Krishnaji Kank was wounded heavily, he died a few days later. However The Portuguese heavy bombardment managed to break through the walls of the fort, severely damaging it.

By 9 November Maratha reinforcements, which included Sambhaji himself, arrived from Rajapur to rescue the fort. He had 800 cavalry and 2,000 infantry with him. Viceroy thought that Sambhaji will attack him from the rear and cut his line of communication with Goa. On 10 November, he called for a general retreat towards the Durbhat port. The Marathas routed the retreating Portuguese by attacking them from a hill above a nearby creek. The viceroy was wounded during this skirmish. On 12 November most of the Portuguese army reached Goa. This victory of Sambhaji has been praised by the Portuguese and they described Sambhaji as a war like prince.

Invasion of Goa 
In the north, the Peshva Brahmin leader by the name Nilopant Pingle kept pressure on Rebdanda. The Marathas also temporarily occupied some territory around Bassein and Damaon. The viceroy had assumed that Sambhaji would quit the heavily damaged Ponda and leave, to the inland Panhala Fort.

On 24 November 1683 at night, when the tide was low, Sambhaji's full force attacked the unsuspecting fort and village on St Estevam island. They captured the fort and plundered its village. A battalion of 200 men marched from Goan capital in order to recapture the island. Seeing the size of the Maratha army, and the devastation caused by them, the battalion retreated to the capital city of Goa.

After the fall of Santo Estêvão, and arrival of the retreating army, the Portuguese broke the bunds of rice fields on the outskirts of the city of Goa. This inundated the fields with river water, the plan worked by increasing the width of the river. Sambhaji had intended to raid Goa but was prevented by the rising tide combined with the flood from rice fields. The Marathas later retreated from the island due to the probability of a Portuguese naval attack.

News reached both Sambhaji and the viceroy, that a Mughal prince, Muazzam, had entered into Maratha territory with a 100,000 strong force. The Moghuls took advantage of Sambhaji's war with the Portuguese as a diversion. Sambhaji tried to bribe Muazzam to get him to use his army against the Portuguese before Moghuls could reach south Konkani city of Goa. With this failing, Sambhaji continued storming the northern parts of the colony, attacking poorly defended villages. By December 1683, the Maratha force had been reinforced and totalled to 6,000 cavalry and 8,000 - 10,000 infantry units. They attacked the areas of Salcette and Bardes and plundered town of Margão. The Portuguese successfully defended the inner territories of Ilhas de Goa and Mormugão from the onslaught of Marathas. All the other villages and forts were temporarily occupied by the Marathas. French factor of Surat Francois Martin has described the poor condition of the Portuguese, he said the viceroy was completely dependent on Moghul aid now. After having laying waste to the outer districts of Salcete and Bardez the Marathas and had started closing in to the Islands of Goa. The viceroy was concerned that if the things remain unchanged, Sambhaji would soon capture the island of Goa. During this time, Muazzam was pillaging through the Maratha territory, as he made his approach towards Sambhaji. When Sambhaji learnt of Muazzam's arrival at Ramghat, fearing the large Moghul army he retreated all his forces back to Raigad Fort on 2 January 1684.

It is said that the viceroy went to the body of Francis Xavier, in the Bom Jesus shrine in the Velha Goa city, and placed his sceptre on the dead saint's relic and prayed for his grace to avert the Maratha threat.  The belief that St Xavier had saved the Portuguese led to the celebration of this occasion annually in Goa.

Aftermath  
Sambhaji wanted peace with the Portuguese, as he was unable to fight a war on two fronts. He sent Prince Akbar and Kavi Kalash to negotiate with the Portuguese. After long negotiations final treaty was approved at Mardangad, between 25 January and 4 February.

Due to the arrival of Portuguese reinforcements in Goa and the Konkan, the Marathas realized that they were not going to be able to continue their conquest against the Portuguese, or keep any of their territories. The Marathas retreated from all their new possessions, in order to concentrate their forces against the Mughals. The campaign was a reality check for Portuguese aspirations in the Konkan. On 12 January 1684, the viceroy called a meeting of the state council to shift the capital Goa to Mormugao fortress further West. This proposal was rejected, and the capital continued to be the City of Goa The viceroy did not expect hostile actions from the Marathas, until he met Sambhaji on the battlefield. In spite of the fact that Goa was well fortified and the Portuguese had a fine navy. The conflicts between the two powers continued in the following years, as Marathas continued raiding the borders, culminating in the Mahratta Invasion of Bassein, the Portuguese however did not make any significant offensive campaigns against the Marathas.

References

Citations

Sources

Conflicts in India
Goa
Goa
Goa
Portuguese India
Colonial India
History of Portugal
Battles involving the Mughal Empire
 History of Goa
 History of Mumbai
 History of Vasai
 History of Daman and Diu